

This is a list of the National Register of Historic Places listings in Phoenix, Arizona.

This is intended to be a complete list of the properties and districts on the National Register of Historic Places in Phoenix, the largest city in Maricopa County, Arizona, United States. The locations of National Register properties and districts for which the latitude and longitude coordinates are included below, may be seen in an online map.

There are 427 properties and districts listed on the National Register in Maricopa County, including 3 that are also National Historic Landmarks. The city of Phoenix is the location of 226 of these properties and districts, including 1 National Historic Landmark; they are listed here, while the remaining properties and districts and 2 National Historic Landmarks are located elsewhere in the county and are listed separately.  Twenty properties in Phoenix were once listed, but have since been removed.  One property, the George E. Cisney House, has been delisted and relisted.

Current listings

|}

Former listings

|}

See also

 National Register of Historic Places listings in Maricopa County, Arizona
 List of National Historic Landmarks in Arizona
 National Register of Historic Places listings in Arizona

References

History of Phoenix, Arizona

Phoenix
Phoenix, Arizona